The Civil Wars is the second and final album by American alternative folk band the Civil Wars. The album was released on August 6, 2013, by Sensibility Music/Columbia Records.

The Civil Wars received generally positive reviews from music critics, and it sold more than 116,000 copies, making it debut at No. 1 on the Billboard 200. The song "From This Valley" won them their fourth Grammy, the second one in the category Best Country Duo/Group Performance.

Promotion
"The One That Got Away" and "From This Valley" were released as singles in June 2013. The third single from the album, "Dust to Dust", was released to Hot adult contemporary radio in the United States on October 7, 2013.

Reception

Critical reception

The Civil Wars received positive reviews from critics. According to Metacritic, the album has scored 71 out of 100 based on 29 reviews, indicating generally favorable reviews, the same score Barton Hollow, the duo's previous album, received.

Commercial performance
The album debuted at No. 1 on the Billboard 200 chart with sales of 116,000 copies.

Track listing

Personnel

The Civil Wars
 Joy Williams – vocals
 John Paul White – electric guitar, acoustic guitar, vocals

Technical personnel
 Charlie Peacock – production, engineering, arrangements 
 Rick Rubin – production ("I Had Me a Girl")
 Tom Elmhirst – mixing
 Ben Baptie – Pro Tools, mixing assistant
 Joe Visciano – mixing assistant

Additional musicians
 Charlie Peacock – piano, Fender Rhodes, keyboards, bass, keyboard bass, drums, LinnDrum
 Sam Ashworth – tambourine, tom-tom, engineer
 Barry Bales – double bass
 Jerry Douglas – Dobro
 Dan Dugmore – lap steel guitar, pedal steel guitar
 Mark Hill – bass
 Andy Leftwitch – fiddle, mandolin
 Jerry McPherson – electric guitar
 Gabe Scott – hammer dulcimer
 Aaron Sterling – cymbals, drums, bass drum
 Jeff Taylor – accordion, harmonium, pump organ, piano

Charts

Weekly charts

Year-end charts

References

The Civil Wars albums
Columbia Records albums
Albums produced by Charlie Peacock
2013 albums
Albums produced by Rick Rubin